Elton Patterson (born June 3, 1981) is a former professional gridiron football defensive end. He was drafted by the Cincinnati Bengals in the seventh round of the 2003 NFL Draft. He played college football at UCF.

Patterson was also a member of the Jacksonville Jaguars, Minnesota Vikings, Berlin Thunder, Orlando Predators, and Hamilton Tiger-Cats.

Early years
Patterson graduated from James S. Rickards High School in Tallahassee, Florida.
Patterson received his undergraduate and master's degree in sports leadership from The University of Central Florida in Orlando, FL

External links
Personal bio & book 
Just Sports Stats
Hamilton Tiger-Cats bio
Orlando Predators bio
UCF Knights bio 

1981 births
Living people
American football defensive ends
American players of Canadian football
Canadian football defensive linemen
UCF Knights football players
Cincinnati Bengals players
Jacksonville Jaguars players
Minnesota Vikings players
Berlin Thunder players
Orlando Predators players
Hamilton Tiger-Cats players
Players of American football from Tallahassee, Florida